The Gudgenby River, a perennial river that is part of the Murrumbidgee catchment within the Murray–Darling basin, is located in the Australian Capital Territory, Australia.

Location and features
Formed by the confluence of Bogong Creek and Middle Creek, the Gudgenby River rises within Namadgi National Park, below Yankee Hat and Mount Gudgenby, on the south-eastern slopes of the Brindabella Range in the south of the Australian Capital Territory (ACT). The river flows generally north and north-east, joined by nine tributaries, including the Naas River and Orroral River, before reaching its confluence with the Murrumbidgee River, near Tharwa. The river descends  over its  course.

The river catchment contains ecologically significant alpine wetlands.

In 2004, ACTEW announced that the creation of a large  reservoir by damming the Gudgenby River, below Mount Tennent, was one of three options being considered as part of the Future Water Options Project in order to provide improved reliability and increased supply of potable water for Canberra and the ACT. By 2005, the ACT Government decided that the creation of the Mount Tennent dam would not proceed; in favour enlarging the Cotter Dam.

Climate 
Gudgenby River, due to its much higher elevation, yields a noticeably cooler climate than that of Canberra. Gudgenby River is precisely where the record low of –14.6 °C for the Australian Capital Territory was recorded.

See also

References

External links
Southern ACT Catchment Group website

 

Rivers of the Australian Capital Territory
Tributaries of the Murrumbidgee River